Mohammad Taheri (born 2 May 1985) is an Iranian professional futsal player.

Honours

Country 
 FIFA Futsal World Cup
 Third place (1): 2016
 AFC Futsal Championship
 Champion (5): 2005 - 2007 - 2008 - 2010 - 2016
 Runners-up (1): 2014
 Asian Indoor and Martial Arts Games
 Champion (3): 2005 - 2007 - 2013
 Confederations Cup
 Champion (1): 2009
 WAFF Futsal Championship
 Champion (1): 2007
 Grand Prix
 Runner-Up (1): 2015

Club 
 AFC Futsal Club Championship
 Champion (1): 2010 (Foolad Mahan)
 Runner-Up (1): 2013 (Giti Pasand)
 Iranian Futsal Super League
 Champion (1): 2009–10 (Foolad Mahan)
 Runners-up (4): 2003–04 (Shahid Mansouri) - 2007–08 (Shahid Mansouri)  - 2013–14 (Giti Pasand) - 2014–15 (Giti Pasand)

Individual 
 Best player:
 2010 AFC Futsal Player of the Year 
 2010 AFC Futsal Championship 
 Top Goalscorer:
 Asian Indoor Games: 2007 (12 goals)
 AFC Futsal Championship: 2010 (13 goals) 
 Iranian Futsal Super League: 2007–08 (Shahid Mansouri) (52 goals)

References

External links 
 
 
 

1985 births
Living people
People from Tehran
Iranian men's futsal players
Futsal forwards
Shahid Mansouri FSC players
Foolad Mahan FSC players
Giti Pasand FSC players
Shahrvand Sari FSC players
Mes Sungun FSC players
Iranian expatriate futsal players
Iranian expatriate sportspeople in Qatar
Iranian expatriate sportspeople in Kuwait
Iranian expatriate sportspeople in Iraq
21st-century Iranian people